Akhlaq Ahmed (10 January 1946 – 4 August 1999) was a Pakistani film playback singer and still considered one of the leading voices of  the film industry.

Early life and career
He was born in Delhi in 1946 and started as a stage singer in the 1960s in Karachi, when he was a member of a famous singing group with two other artists, Masood Rana and Nadeem. Akhlaq Ahmad was the third generation of  male playback singers in the Pakistan film industry. He struggled for many years, but gained some recognition in the 1970s as a playback singer. "Sona Na Chandi Na Koi Mahal" film song in film Bandish (1980), and "Sawan Aye Sawan Jaye" in film Chahat (1974), are his big hit film songs. Both of these film songs were composed by music director Robin Ghosh. His song tally is under one hundred songs. Famous Indian singer Sonu Nigam sang many songs of Akhlaq Ahmed as Sonu's voice closely resembles with Akhlaq's and released these songs in late 1990s.

Earlier Akhlaq Ahmed had first started singing for friends at gathering just for fun. Then he was a member of a famous singing group from Karachi with two other artists, film playback singer Masood Rana and film actor Nadeem. At first, he started singing as a stage singer in the 1960s. Akhlaq Ahmed debuted as a film singer in the 1973 film, Pazaib with music by Lal Mohammad Iqbal. He was unable to get a dominant place in the Pakistan film industry because when he started his singing career, at that time Ahmed Rushdi was the prominent playback singer in the Pakistani film industry. Despite that, he remained a somewhat successful singer in the late 1970s and 1980s due to his singing talent.

Death
Akhlaq Ahmed spent the last few years of his life fighting the disease of blood cancer which was diagnosed back in 1985. His wife, an employee at Pakistan International Airlines (PIA) admitted him at a hospital in London. He died on 4 August 1999, at London and was laid to rest at Walthem Forest Muslim cemetery London.

His last film as a singer was Nikah (1998).

Popular songs
 Sawan Aye, Sawan Jaye, Tujh Ko Pukaren Geet Hamaray... 1974 (Film: Chahat, Music: Robin Ghosh
 Ae Dil, Apna Dard Chhupa Kar, Geet Khushi Kay Gaye Ja..1975 (Film: Pehchan - Music: Nisar Bazmi
 Raat Bhar Jiya Mora Mujhay Kyun Sataye..1975 (Film: Umang - Music: Robin Ghosh
 Dekho Yeh Kon Aa Geya, Ban Kay Nasha Chha Geya..1975 (Film: 2 Sathi - Music: Robin Ghosh
 Ek Thi Guriya Bari Bholi Bhali..1975 (Film: 2 Sathi - Music: Robin Ghosh
 Main Hun, Rastey Ka Pathar, Hay Naseeb Mera Thokar..1976 (Film: Rastay Ka Pathar - Music: Nashad
 Sathi Meray, Bin Teray, Kaisay Beetay Gi..1976 (Film: Zubaida - Music:Kamal Ahmed
 Sona Na Chandi, Na Koi Mahal, Jan-e-Mann..1980 (Film: Bandish - Music: Robin Ghosh
 Samaan, Woh Khawab Sa Samaa..1980 (Film: Nahin Abhi Nahin - Music: Robin Ghosh
 Kabhi Khwahishon Nay Loota..1982 (Film: Mehrbani - Music: M. Ashraf

Awards and recognition
 7 Nigar Awards for Best Male Playback Singer – won this award 7 times in 1980, 1982, 1983, 1984, 1986, 1987 and in 1990.

References

External links 
Akhlaq Ahmed on IMDb website

1946 births
1999 deaths
Muhajir people
Pakistani playback singers
Urdu-language singers
Nigar Award winners
20th-century Pakistani male singers